Mahdi Fahri Albaar (born 27 September 1995) is an Indonesian professional footballer who plays as a right-back for Liga 1 club PSM Makassar.

Club career

Persiter Ternate
When he was a teenager, Mahdi has already played for senior team of Persiter Ternate and before eventually, he went to Uruguay to joined with Deportivo Indonesia

Mitra Kukar
In 2015, Mahdi joined Mitra Kukar F.C. with his colleagues in the Indonesia U-19, namely Ryuji Utomo, Dinan Javier, Ravi Murdianto and Septian David Maulana

Bali United
In 2016, Mahdi joined Bali United F.C. in 2016 Indonesia Soccer Championship A

Celebest (loan)
He was signed for Celebest to play in the Liga 2 in the 2017 season, on loan from Bali United.

International career
In 2013, he was called U-19 team in the 2013 AFF U-19 Youth Championship, he took the team to win the AFF U-19 Youth Championship for the first time.

Honours

International
Indonesia U19
 AFF U-19 Youth Championship: 2013

References

External links
 

1995 births
Living people
Indonesian footballers
Sportspeople from North Maluku
People from Ternate
Association football defenders
Persiter Ternate players
Mitra Kukar players
Bali United F.C. players
PS TIRA players
Liga 1 (Indonesia) players
Liga 2 (Indonesia) players
Indonesia youth international footballers